Peter Wegner (born 1953) is a Melbourne-based figurative painter, sculptor, and draughtsman. His work hangs in many galleries in Australia, and he is known for winning the Archibald Prize in 2021.

Early life and education

Peter Wegner was born in 1953.

He gained a fine arts degree in 1985, and obtained a postgraduate diploma in 1988 from the Phillip Institute of Technology. In 2007 he completed a Master of Fine Arts at Monash University.

Career

After Wegner exhibited his work in a in group exhibition in 1977, having had no training in art, he was awarded  a two-year A.M.E. Bale residential painting scholarship under Sir William Dargie.

After gaining his degree and diploma, he started lecturing in the Drawing Department of Ballarat University, and has also since been a visiting lecturer at La Trobe, Monash and RMIT universities.

Exhibitions 

Wegner has held many solo exhibitions since 1982 and his work has been included in many group exhibitions.
 Dobell Prize for Drawing, Art Gallery of New South Wales, 2012
 BP Portrait Prize, National Portrait Gallery, London and Edinburgh, 2012
 Archibald Prize finalists, 2011
 Archibald Prize finalists, 2020
Archibald Prize winner, 2021

Awards 
 2021 Winner Archibald Prize 
 2016: Rick Amor Prize for small drawings, Art Gallery of Ballarat, for Three Days with EM
 2013: Winner, Gallipoli Art Prize
 2006: Doug Moran National Portrait Prize, for Wounded Poet 2006 (Graham Doyle)
 Four-time finalist in the Archibald Prize.
 1978-1980: A.M.E. Bale residential painting scholarship under Sir William Dargie

Public collections 
Wegner's work is held in public collections including:
 National Portrait Gallery (Canberra)
 Don Argus (2004)
 Jacques Miller (2002)
 Victor Smorgon (2000)
 Graeme Clark (2000). As an etching, profile, and portrait.
 John Marsden (1998)
 Art Gallery of New South Wales
 National Library of Australia
 Tasmanian Museum and Art Gallery
 Heide Museum of Modern Art, Melbourne
 State Library of Victoria

References

External links

 (Curriculum vitae)

Artists from Melbourne
Australian painters
Doug Moran National Portrait Prize winners
Monash University alumni
RMIT University alumni
Archibald Prize finalists
1953 births
Living people